Oliver v Bradley CA51/87 [1987] NZCA 70; [1987] 1 NZLR 586; (1987) 4 NZFLR 449 is a cited case in New Zealand regarding whether de facto relationship property is held in a constructive trust.

References

Court of Appeal of New Zealand cases
1987 in New Zealand law